Proichthydiidae is a family of worms belonging to the order Chaetonotida.

Genera:
 Proichthydioides Sudzuki, 1971
 Proichthydium Cordero, 1918

References

Gastrotricha